Trelash is a hamlet in the civil parish of Warbstow, Cornwall, England, United Kingdom.

References

External links

Hamlets in Cornwall